The Chapman Sandstone is a geologic formation in Maine. It preserves fossils dating back to the Devonian period.

See also 
 List of fossiliferous stratigraphic units in Maine
 Paleontology in Maine

References 

Devonian Maine
Devonian southern paleotemperate deposits